Be Careful What You Wish For is the debut collaborative studio album by South African recording artists AKA and Anatii. It was released on July 28, 2017, by Beam Group and YAL Entertainment, under exclusive licence to Universal Music South Africa.

Singles
"10 Fingers" was released as the lead single on January 8, 2017. The track was produced by Anatii.

"Holy Mountain" and "Don't Forget to Pray" were released as the second and third singles respectively. Both songs received positive response from critics.

Critical reception

The album received positive response from critics. At Yo Mzansi, it received a positive rating of 9/10.

Track listing
Adapted from Apple Music.

Release history

References

2017 albums
Anatii albums
AKA (rapper) albums